Thirteen (officially stylised as TH13TEEN) is a steel roller coaster/ Haunted attraction/ Drop tower at Alton Towers in England. The ride was constructed by Intamin and opened on 20 March 2010. It is the world's first vertical freefall drop roller coaster, on which the track and train freefall approximately five metres in darkness. The ride replaced and is built on the former site of the Corkscrew, which resided at Alton Towers for 28 years between 1980 and 2008.

Development history

Alton Towers first revealed their plans for the ride in October 2008 when it was announced that Corkscrew would be removed. Planning permission was initially delayed due to concerns about an Iron Age hill fort in its vicinity. However, in March 2009, Staffordshire Moorlands District Council accepted planning permission for the ride (with conditions) and groundwork construction commenced about three months later. During the planning stages and construction, the ride was codenamed Secret Weapon 6.

John Wardley, a ride consultant for Merlin Entertainments, spoke about the development of Thirteen in an interview shortly after the ride's opening. The initial idea for the secret element originated from a previous rollercoaster plan that he designed for Alton Towers, in which a piece of track tilted back and forth during the ride. The ride, if it had been built, would have been similar to Winja's Fear & Force at Phantasialand, Germany.

The ageing Corkscrew roller coaster was removed ahead of the new ride's development. The coaster model was decided as an Intamin family coaster, chosen for the lightweight trains to perform the vertical drop element.

The concept and theme was designed by Merlin Magic Making (MMM). The Alton Towers marketing team made an effort to keep the "world's first" element secret so that the surprise feature would not be revealed until the ride was opened. In 2008, concept art showing possible themes for the new ride were leaked online but only appeared briefly after they were deleted at Alton Towers' command.

In a press statement that was released several months after construction started, the ride was promoted as a 'psychoaster' and was said to create a level of psychological fear.

Advertisement

Various phrases and slogans were used to promote the ride. In August, a banner was erected next to the construction site on 8 October reading: "Ride into the Unknown". Alton Towers released a new marketing campaign later inviting readers to "Ride the Demon of the Dark Forest" and "Surrender in March 2010". However, neither of these campaigns expressly revealed the name of the new ride. The attraction's name was officially announced as Thirteen on 11 December 2009 through a press release. The ride's main slogan was used after: "If you go down to the woods today, you'd better not go alone."

During the park's 2009 Scarefest, hooded wraiths were seen roaming around the Ug Land area in the build-up to the new ride. Warning signs were put up explaining their appearance was linked to "next year's new ride".

The resort has also used viral marketing through social-networking websites to promote the ride. Alton Towers released many online and television teaser videos in the run up to the opening of the ride. These included a video of a truck supposedly delivering the "secret weapon", and three promotional blipverts which featured a possessed girl walking in a forest. The full adverts were released before opening day, with a pre-watershed and post-watershed version. The advertisement to be shown after 9 pm included the same girl seen in previous videos being entangled by moving branches as she whispered: "If you go down to the woods today, you'd better not go alone... 13". The advert also uses a short but 'darker' version of the Alton Towers theme music (Edvard Grieg's In the Hall of the Mountain King).

Publicity 
An early press release initially stated that thirteen - deemed to be the scariest rollercoaster ever created (with a world's first element) would require a signed waiver of liability just to ride. They also said there would be an age restriction of 16–55 years old allowed on. This however was only a marketing ploy and there were no age limits or other restrictions put in place, aside from the height restrictions: riders must be over 1.2 metres and under 1.96 metres to ride.

On 22 July 2010, Alton Towers announced on their Facebook page that Thirteen would be closed on Friday 13 August 2010, because of superstitious reasons. Morwenna Angove, Head of Marketing at the Resort, stated: "Our research has revealed that Britons are a seriously superstitious bunch, and as our latest ride is named after the unluckiest of numbers, we've taken the decision to close that ride on Friday 13 to reassure our visitors." It was later revealed that the ride was to be renamed 'Fourteen' (stylized as FOU13TEEN) throughout Friday 13 August 2010 instead of closing. New limited merchandise was available during the day featuring the 'Fourteen' name. Most signage to the ride was temporarily changed to feature the new name.

Ride experience

The ride starts with a girl's voice whispering If you go down to the woods today, you'd better not go... ...alone before the train takes a sharp, unbanked left turn out of the station into a  lift hill up to the main drop, which sends the train speeding into woodland at up to 41 mph. Thirteen's track layout performs many airtime hills (limited by the many trim brakes on the layout) and banked turns, before entering a second lift hill which leads into a dark crypt where the surprise element takes place. Sections of the outdoor track have been fitted with speed-reducing devices due to early problems with the ride entering its second lift hill too quickly.

The entry door is closed behind the train as it comes to a halt and the sound of creaking wood is heard. Suddenly, the lights go out and the train jolts, before the track and train freefall drop around 5 metres. A wraith figure is illuminated in front of the train and compressed air blasts towards riders. The train is propelled backwards out of the crypt, drops in height and proceeds into a disorienting backwards helix.

The train emerges from the darkness and stops behind a transfer track, which switches the path of the train back towards the station before the train is propelled forwards and arrives at the offload platform.

'World's First' element
Since the project was announced in late 2008, the ride was confirmed to join the growing line of world first rides at Alton Towers. It was confirmed that the well-kept 'secret weapon' element would take place in the showroom section, a building next to the station. It was revealed on 17 March 2010, that the ride is the "world's first free-fall drop roller coaster". This was shown on GMTV, on a special feature about Thirteen and also had an on-ride video of some of the first riders. A view of the ride was also shown on Central Tonight, and shows the freefall section in brighter lighting than GMTV had shown earlier on in the day. This surprise sequence consists of a horizontal section of track, on which the train stops, which freefalls downwards, making Thirteen the world's first vertical free-fall roller coaster.

References

External links
 
 
 Official Alton Towers 2010 Page
 Official Alton Towers Flickr
 Official Alton Towers Website

Roller coasters introduced in 2010
Roller coasters in the United Kingdom
Roller coasters operated by Merlin Entertainments
Alton Towers